"Cloud-Chief" is an intermezzo composed by J. Ernest Philie in 1910. "Cloud-Chief" was named for the Southern Cheyenne chief of the same name.

References

Bibliography
Philie, J. Ernest. "Cloud-Chief" (Sheet music). Boston:Walter Jacobs (1910).

External links
"'Cloud Chief", American Symphony Orchestra (Edison Standard 10346, 1910)—Cylinder Preservation and Digitization Project.

1910 songs